F-1 Favorit is a light sporting biplane for aerobatics, a modernized version of B2M Mosquit. It was designed and built by the Avion Group together with Moscow Aviation Institute specialists.

Specifications (MAI F-1)

References

External links

 Avion F-1 Favorit at airliners.net

Russian sources
  F-1
  B2M Mosquit
  B2M Mosquit drawing
  F-1

2000s Russian sport aircraft
Biplanes
Single-engined tractor aircraft
Aircraft first flown in 2006